The Junkers W 34 was a German-built, single-engine, passenger and transport aircraft. Developed in the 1920s, it was taken into service in 1926. The passenger version could take a pilot and five passengers. The aircraft was developed from the Junkers W 33. Further development led to the Junkers Ju 46.

Production and service

One Junkers W 34 be/b3e managed to break the then-current altitude record on 26 May 1929 when it reached . That aircraft carried the markings D-1119 and it was equipped with a Bristol Jupiter VII engine. The airplane was flown by Willi Neuenhofen.

The Junkers W 34 was manufactured in many different versions. The total production numbers for the civil market were around 1,000, a further 2,024 his and haus were built under license for the RLM and Luftwaffe. The unit price was between RM 65,000 and 70,400.

On 31 January 1944 the Luftwaffe still had 618 W 34his and 516 W 34haus in service: the majority were used by flight schools; mainly as navigator and radio operator training (3 or 4 navigator or radio-operator trainees).

The Junkers K.43, nicknamed the "Bush Bomber", was used extensively during the Chaco War (1932–1935) fought between Bolivia and Paraguay. See external links.

The Colombian Air Force used the W 34 and K-43 in the Colombia-Peru War in 1932–3.

The Swedish Air Force operated three W 33/34 between 1933 and 1953 in the transport and air ambulance roles, initially with the military designation Trp 2 and Trp 2A, eventually changed to Tp 2 and Tp 2A. One of these is preserved today in civilian colors as SE-BYA.

In 1930 Finnish Air Force bought a single W 34 (JU-122) for maritime operations and six K 43s (JU-123 – JU-128) for use as light bombers, during Continuation war the planes were used as transports, evacuating wounded and supplying Long-Range Recon Patrols behind the enemy lines. Additional five W 34s were bought in 1944 for radio navigation training (JU-131 – 135), after the war Finnish Border Guard operated the remaining planes until 1950. 

ProductionW 34 hi: Junkers (105 aircraft built), Henschel (430), ATG (94), Dornier Wismar (58), HFB (69) and Weser (221).W 34 hau''': Henschel (329), Arado Brandenburg (205), ATG (105), Dornier Wismar (93), HFB (192) and MIAG Braunschweig (73).

Variants

W 34 a 331 kW Gnome et Rhône 9A Jupiter engine, speed: 190 km/h, wingspan: 17.75 m and length 11.10 m
W 34 be 375 kW Gnome et Rhône 9A Jupiter engine, speed: 230 km/h, wingspan: 17.75 m, length: 10.70 m
W 34 be/b3e 441 kW Bristol Jupiter VII engine and was used for attempts to try breaking the world altitude record
W 34 ci 405 kW Pratt & Whitney Hornet engine, speed: 245 km/h, equipped with cabin windows
W 34 di like the W 34 ci, the engine was license produced by BMW.
W 34 f 331 kW Gnome et Rhône 9A Jupiter  engine, speed 190 km/h, wingspan 18.48 m, length 11.10 m, enclosed cockpit, ailerons were lengthened; the export version had a cargo door
W 34 f experimental aircraft with floats
W 34 fa passenger aircraft for export
W 34 fä export aircraft
W 34 fo export aircraft with a Pratt & Whitney R-1340  engine
W 34 fy Armstrong Siddeley Panther engine
W 34 fao 397 kW Siemens-Halske Sh 20 engine, only one was produced for tests with autopilot
W 34 fei 441 kW Siemens-Halske Sh 20U engine, only one was produced as a maritime test aircraft
W 34 fg Armstrong Siddeley Jaguar Major engine
W 34 fue Pratt & Whitney Hornet engine, later rebuilt as a maritime aircraft.
W 34 fi Pratt & Whitney or BMW built 405 kW Hornet; wingspan: 18.48 m, length 10.27 m, speed 260 km/h. The aircraft had an enclosed cockpit and low-pressure tires.
W 34 gi 405 kW BMW Hornet, only one machine was produced in 1933 for tests
W 34 hi 485 kW BMW 132A/E, the aircraft could take six passengers and was equipped with improved radio- and direction finders. This version was mostly used by Luftwaffe to train pilots and radio operators.
W 34 hau similar to hi, but it had a 526 kW Bramo 322 H engine. The type was mostly used by Luftwaffe to train its pilots and radio operators.
K 43 Military W34, available in many of the above-mentioned versions.

Operators

Argentine Air Force
Argentine Naval Aviation – 1 W34 purchased in 1934, used as trainer 

Guinea Airways
Royal Australian Air Force

Bolivian Air Force

Syndicato Condor – Serviços Aéreos Condor

Bulgarian Air Force

Royal Canadian Air Force
Canadian Airways

Chilean Air Force

Chinese Nationalist Air Force

Colombian Air Force
SCADTA(Avianca)Zrakoplovstvo Nezavisne Države HrvatskeCzechoslovak Air Force

Finnish Air Force
Finnish Border GuardLuftwaffeRoyal Norwegian Air Force

Portuguese Army Aviation (Aeronáutica Militar) operated W 34L aircraft.Forças Aéreas da Armada operated K 43W aircraft.

Royal Romanian Air Force operated 10 W 34 hi aircraft.

Slovak Air Force (1939–45)
 Spanish State
Spanish Air Force

Swedish Air Force

South African Airways operated 2 aircraft.
South African Air Force

Venezuelan Air Force

Accidents and incidents
 
 
 

Specifications (W 34he landplane)

References

Further reading
 Andersson, Lennart. "Chinese 'Junks': Junkers Aircraft Exports to China 1925-1940". Air Enthusiast'', No. 55, Autumn 1994, pp. 2–7.

External links

 History of Bolivian Junkers K.43's use during fighting over the Gran Chaco area.
 Warbirds Resource Group-Luftwaffe Resource Center – Junkers Ju W34
 The Hugo Junkers Homepage by Horst Zoeller - Junkers W33/W34
 "Flyers Of The Sea", October 1931, Popular Mechanics

1920s German military transport aircraft
W34
Aircraft first flown in 1926